Medibuntu (Multimedia, Entertainment & Distractions In Ubuntu) was a community-maintained repository of Debian packages that could not be included in the Ubuntu distribution for legal reasons.

Reasons for non-inclusion include copyright, license or patent restrictions, or geographical variations in legislation, such as:

 patentability of software, algorithms, formats and other abstract creation
 legal restrictions on freedom of speech or communication
 restrictions on the use of certain types of technology, such as cryptography
 legal restrictions on imports of software technology, requiring for example specific permissions
 offense which packages may cause to users that would make them unsuitable for Ubuntu's universe repository

Much free software and non-free software is affected by such restrictions somewhere in the world, thus preventing its inclusion into Ubuntu. Medibuntu packaged and distributed such software. Downloading, using, distributing or otherwise dealing with software from Medibuntu was possibly illegal depending on the user's jurisdiction/region. Examples of software in Medibuntu were Acrobat Reader, non-free codecs, Google Earth, and RealPlayer.

Current status
As of October 2013, the Medibuntu Project has come to an end. The Medibuntu repository is unmaintained and offline.

See also
GetDeb
Penguin Liberation Front (Mandriva equivalent)
RPM Fusion (Fedora/RedHat equivalent)

References

Linux package management-related software
Ubuntu